Komyakino is a rural locality (a village) in Druzhnensky Selsoviet Rural Settlement, Kurchatovsky District, Kursk Oblast, Russia. Population:

Geography 
The village is located on the Reut River, 46 km south-west of Kursk, 8.5 km south-west of the district center – the town Kurchatov, 2 km from the selsoviet center – Druzhnaya

 Climate
Komyakino has a warm-summer humid continental climate (Dfb in the Köppen climate classification).

Transport 

The rural locality is situated 53 km from Kursk Vostochny Airport, 128 km from Belgorod International Airport and 255 km from Voronezh Peter the Great Airport.

References

Notes

Sources

Rural localities in Kurchatovsky District, Kursk Oblast